Another place is a euphemism used in many bicameral parliaments using the Westminster system.

Another place may also refer to:

Another Place (sculpture), a piece of modern sculpture by Sir Antony Gormley
Another Place (Hiroshima album), 1985, or the title track
Another Place (Rick Price album), 1999
Another Place, a 1978 album by American jazz musician Fred Anderson
"Another Place", a song by Bastille from their 2019 album Doom Days

See also
Another Time, Another Place (disambiguation)
Another Place, Another Time (disambiguation)
The Other Place (disambiguation)